Angela Masson (born 1951) is an American pilot and artist. She was the first woman to be type-rated on the Boeing 747 on June 30, 1984.

Flying career
Masson began flying lessons at age 15 at Clover Field in Santa Monica, California. Shortly after getting her pilot's license, she started air racing. At age 21, while flying in the Powder Puff Derby, she set a record as the youngest person to fly coast to coast in a high performance aircraft.

In 1971 she trained armed forces pilot cadets at fellow aviatrix Claire Walters Flight School to build her flight experience, getting over 1,000 flight hours in less than a year. She then went on to fly as a charter pilot for Express Airways out of Naval Air Station Lemoore on a civilian contract for the Navy. Frustrated to see her former male students flying jets while females were barred from the military, she went back to school. At age 24, she wrote her PhD dissertation "Elements of Organizational Discrimination: The Air Force Response to Women as Military Pilots," which was presented before Congress during the Hearings about opening military the Academies to women (a copy can be found in the Congressional Records). Her paper was read by Robert Crandall, then President of American Airlines, who hired her as a pilot for American in 1976, at age 25. During her career there, she was the first woman to fly as First Officer on the Boeing 707, 767 and Douglas DC-10.

Masson earned aircraft type-ratings on the Airbus A310, Boeing 747, 757, 767, 777, DC-9, DC-10, and MD-11. She holds the ATP license with commercial glider and seaplane endorsements, as well as flight engineer, ground and flight instructor certificates.

Flying as Captain for over 20 years, she was the first female Chief Pilot for American Airlines (Miami domicile, 1997). As the most senior female pilot, she retired with over 31 years total service in December 2007.

Academic career
Dr. Masson graduated from Collegio Monte Rosa in Territet, Switzerland and got her BFA, MA, MPA and PhD in Public Administration from the University of Southern California. The Federation Aeronautique Internationale lists Dr. Masson's numerous Commercial Air Route Speed Awards set in the Boeing 777.

Art
A gifted artist, she was honored in art shows in Italy at the age of 18. She also sang: under the stage name "Tangela Tricoli" she recorded an album in 1982, "Jet Lady," which was re-released in 2004 by ArfArf records. She briefly hosted The Tangela Tricoli Talk Show on public access TV in Los Angeles.

Patents

The first true electronic flight bag, a computing device designed specifically to replace a pilot’s entire kit bag, was patented by Masson as the Electronic Kit Bag (EKB) in 1999. Her multiple patents describe a solution to aid pilots in their normal aviation activities, however, the EKB is intended to also function as a life-saving control device, able to land an aircraft remotely in the event of pilot incapacitation.

References

External links
 Interview with Angela Masson at You Fly, Girl
  Angela Masson, Featured Pilot for AOPA Pilot Magazine, May 2013
 Museum of Flying: Angela Masson

Living people
American aviators
University of Southern California alumni
Outsider musicians
USC Sol Price School of Public Policy alumni
American aviation record holders
American women aviation record holders
1951 births
21st-century American women